Carmin may refer to:

"Carmín" (song), song from Romeo Santos album Golden
Isaac H. Carmin (1841–1919), American soldier
Carmín Vega (born 1955), Puerto Rican singer and comedian

See also
 Carman (surname)
 Carmen (given name)
 Carmen (surname)
 Carmine (given name)
 Carmine (surname)
 Carman (disambiguation)
 Carmen (disambiguation)
 Carmine (disambiguation)